This is a list of mayors and chairmen of the City of Richmond, a former local government area in Melbourne, Victoria, Australia and its precedents. It existed from 1855 until 1994 when it merged with the City of Collingwood and City of Fitzroy to form the new City of Yarra.

Council name

Chairman (1856–1862)

Mayors (1862–1982)

Commissioner (1982–1988)
In 1982, the Richmond council was sacked by the state government following a report which revealed allegations of electoral malpractice and fraud. The council was replaced by a state-appointed commissioner to administer the city in its stead until an elected council was restored in 1988.

Mayors (1988–1994)

City of Yarra mayors (from 1996)

See also
 Richmond Town Hall, Melbourne
 List of mayors of Collingwood
 List of mayors of Fitzroy

External links
 Yarra City Council

References

 Richmond Chairmen and Mayors
 Machine politics, corruption and the Richmond City Council
 History of the City of Yarra, List of Former Mayors

Richmond
Mayors Richmond